Institute for Balkan Studies can refer to:
 Institute for Balkan Studies (Greece)
 Institute for Balkan Studies (Serbia)